Highland Radio is the local radio service for the County Donegal (North) franchise, operating under a licence from the Broadcasting Authority of Ireland (BAI). Headquartered at the Mountain Top in Letterkenny, the station broadcasts throughout a large swathe of Ulster (especially West Ulster), with it being received in the nearby city of Derry and in much of the rest of County Londonderry, as well as in large parts of County Tyrone and County Fermanagh, and in parts of County Antrim.

Highland began broadcasting on 15 March 1990, and is currently franchised until 2024. It is currently Ireland's 'Number One Local Radio Station', a claim backed up by having both the highest market share of any local station within the Republic of Ireland. Highland Radio employs 21 full-time and 40 part-time employees.

Its flagship current affairs programme is The Nine 'til Noon Show, which is presented by Greg Hughes.

On 12 August 2012, Highland Radio received an international exclusive interview with Jamaican sprinter Usain Bolt live on air from the Summer Olympics in Stratford in London.

History
On 31 May 2005, it was announced that the station was to be purchased by Scottish Radio Holdings for €7 million. However, SRH itself was acquired by Emap 21 days later. The deal was cleared by both the BCI and the Irish Competition Authority. Emap's sole changes to the station were increasing the bandwidth of their web streams from 20 kbit/s to 128 kbit/s, with no format or presenter changes.

Denis O'Brien's Communicorp was the highest bidder for Emap's Irish operations when that company decided to sell its radio stations, buying FM104, Highland Radio and Today FM on 14 July 2007. In October 2007, the Broadcasting Commission of Ireland (BCI) approved Communicorp's proposed takeover of Today FM and Highland Radio, but not FM104. The deal was completed by January 2008. Due to a Competition Authority decision, Communicorp was required to sell-on FM104, which it did (to UTV Media) immediately upon its acquisition. O'Brien offloaded Highland Radio in mid-2008.

Orangold, a company owned by the Rabbitt family, completed the purchase of Highland Radio from Denis O'Brien's Communicorp Group in July 2008. Gerry Rabbitt is a founder shareholder of Galway Bay FM and was managing director of Galway Bay FM for 10 years.

Highland Radio News and Sport

The Highland Radio News team is headed by Greg Hughes and includes Donal Kavanagh, Michaela Clarke, Emma Ryan and Daniel Brennan

Highland Radio News airs their own bulletins Mondays to Fridays on the hour from 7.00am until 7.00pm. The news service gives extensive coverage of local news and events from across the City of Derry and Counties Donegal, Londonderry, and Tyrone. There are currently three main extended news bulletins Mondays to Fridays at 8.30am, 1.00pm and 5.00pm.  From 8.00pm until 12-midnight, Highland Radio airs hourly live news bulletins provided by Newstalk in Dublin.

Highland Radio News has a limited provision of local news over the weekend. Saturdays have local bulletins on the hour from 10.00am until 2.00pm. Newstalk provides news bulletins at 8.00am, 9.00am and then on the hour from 3.00pm until 12-midnight.  On Sundays, Highland Radio provides local news from 1.00pm -6.00pm. Newstalk provides the rest of Sundays news output on the station on the hour from 8.00am until 12-midnight.

Highland Radio gives extensive coverage to all the main sporting events held in County Donegal, County Londonderry, and County Tyrone, as well as in the city of Derry. The station broadcasts the results of all major Irish League fixtures played in Northern Ireland, in addition to broadcasting the results of all major League of Ireland fixtures played in the Republic of Ireland.

During Christmas, Easter and Bank Holidays, Newstalk provide the only news bulletins on the hour.

Presenter and schedules

Daytime presenters
 Lee Gooch
 Greg Hughes
 John Breslin
 David James
 Ivan Boreland

Highland Radio News Team: Greg Hughes, Donal Kavanagh, Michaela Clarke, Emma Ryan.

Evening presenters
 Tommy Rosney 
 Marty Friel
 Pio McCann (died in October 2020)
 Aidan Murphy 
 Bernard Harper 
 Paul McDevitt
 Rosemary Herraghty 
 Colm Ferriter
 Oisin Kelly

Weekend presenters 
 Canice Wilson
 Rory Farrell
 Paul McDevitt
 Kevin Furey
 Frank Galligan
 Keith Fletcher
 Joe Deckz
 Aidan Murphy
 Bernard Harper
 Ciaran O'Donnell
 Jean Curran
 Róise Ní hOireachtaigh

Daytime schedule

Evening schedule

References

External links
 Official website
 BCI licence details
 JNLR listenersip summary
 Scottish to buy Highland Radio for €7m – RTÉ article

Adult contemporary radio stations in Ireland
Contemporary hit radio stations in Ireland
Country radio stations in Ireland
Mass media in Letterkenny
News and talk radio stations in Ireland
Radio stations in Ireland
Radio stations in the Republic of Ireland